is a 2011 independently made Japanese short kaiju film initially directed by Nobuaki Sugimoto, and was completed by Koichi Kawakita and co-produced by Dream Planet Japan and Marbling Fine Arts. The film is based on the 1993 children's book of the same name by Masamoto Nasu.

Production 

 Directed by Koichi Kawakita, Nobuaki Sugimoto
 Produced by Norihiko Iwasaki
 Cinematography by Takehiro Kuramochi, Keiichi Sakurai
 Edited by Koichi Kawakita

Release 
The film premiered at the Bigfoot Crest Theater in Westwood, Los Angeles on June 23, 2011,  it was also screened during the Kaiju Gaiden Strikes Back panel at G-Fest XXVI on July 15, 2017.

References

External links 
 
 

2011 films
2010s Japanese-language films
2011 fantasy films
2010s monster movies
Tokusatsu films
Giant monster films
Kaiju films
2011 short films
2011 independent films
2010s Japanese films